Montaser Marai is a Palestinian - Jordanian journalist and documentary filmmaker, who has worked for Al Jazeera since 2002.

Documentary Films

References

Living people
Palestinian film directors
Jordanian journalists
Palestinian journalists
Year of birth missing (living people)